Serotonin is a novel by French writer Michel Houellebecq, published in January 2019.

Plot 

The narrator, Florent-Claude Labrouste, is a depressed agricultural scientist who lives in a Parisian apartment block, the Tour Totem. He  commutes to Normandy to help promote French cheese. Sympathetic to the plight of local farmers, he is powerless to help them retain their traditional methods:

After watching a television documentary about people who choose to disappear from their life without telling anyone, Labrouste abruptly leaves his girlfriend, a young Japanese woman who is highly sexual but devoid of affection, quits his job under a false pretence and flees to a chain hotel in another part of Paris. 

A doctor prescribes him an antidepressant to remedy his low levels of serotonin, hence the title of the novel. Although the drug dulls his sex drive, Labrouste returns to Normandy in search of former lovers. While there, he visits an old college friend, Aymeric, a divorced and suicidal aristocratic landowner. At the climax of the novel, farmers equipped with assault rifles blockade a motorway. Aymeric is among them and shoots himself, sparking a clash with riot police in which 10 more people die.

Later on, Labrouste begins secretly observing the love of his life, Camille, who has a son from another man. At first intending to shoot the child with one of Aymeric's sniper rifles in order to win back her love, he finds himself unable to go through with it. Finally, Labrouste moves back to Paris, contemplating committing suicide by jumping out of a window.

Themes 

The novel depicts French farmers struggling to survive in the face of globalisation, agribusiness and European Union policies. It foresaw many concerns of the yellow vests movement which began protesting in France in late 2018. Written before protesters began blockading roads in real life, Serotonin soon joined previous Houellebecq novels Platform and Submission in being termed eerily prophetic by critics.

As with many of Houllebecq's works, the protagonist is an alienated, middle-aged man. Serotonin features its author's trademark black humour and depictions of loveless sex, and also touches on paedophilia (when the narrator spies on a suspicious German tourist) and bestiality (when he finds pornographic videos of his girlfriend on her computer). The overall mood is one of spiritual malaise and social fracture during the decline of the West.

Publication 
The initial print run in France was 320,000 copies. German, Italian and Spanish editions were published the same month. An English translation by Shaun Whiteside was published in the United Kingdom by William Heinemann on 26 September 2019. Whiteside's translation was published in the United States by Farrar, Straus and Giroux on 19 November 2019.

Reception 

In France, Serotonin was the best-selling fiction book in the week it was released. Within three days of its publication, it had sold 90,000 copies. The release was considered a national event, coming as it did the same month Houellebecq was awarded the Legion of Honour.

In response to the narrator of Serotonin calling Niort "one of the ugliest towns I've ever seen", the town's mayor said that he would send some locally grown angelica to Houellebecq's publisher to cheer up the notoriously gloomy author.

References 

Novels by Michel Houellebecq
2019 French novels
French-language novels
Dystopian novels
Fiction set in 2019
Novels set in Paris
Novels set in Normandy
Éditions Flammarion books